My Father Godfather is a 2014 Bollywood comedy, romance, drama movie directed by Pankaj Dheer and written by Ankur Pajni and produced by Essel Vision production. It was released in April 2014. The film has an ensemble cast which includes the popular TV actress Kratika sengar and Sharad Malhotra. The film was supposed to release in Theatre but it was released on Web & Television.

Plot
Jahnavi (Kratika Sengar) and Prakash (Sharad Malhotra) are couple and are struggling in the television industry to make a mark. Jahanavi wants to be a famous actress while Prakash wants to be a writer. How difficult circumstances force Jhanvi to take a stance which makes her entire world go topsy turvy forms the crux of the story.

Cast
 Kratika Sengar as Jahnavi
 Sharad Malhotra as Prakash
Aditya Pancholi  as Don Suraj Singh
 Shagufta Ali as Mamiji
 Vijay Kashyap as Mamaji
 Arun Bali as Maalik
 Abhsihek Duhan as Tittoo
 Ishaan Chhibber as Rimmey
 Utkarsha Naik as Constable Sheetal
 Vishal Thakkar as Roshan
 Aradhana Uppal as Boutique Owner
 Nishikant Dixit as Casting Coordinator 
 Shamiksha Bhatnagar as Sabrina
Johnny Lever (Special appearance)

References

External links
 

2010s Hindi-language films
2014 films